The Church of Mediano is a 16th-century submerged church located in Mediano, a submerged municipality in La Fueva, province of Huesca, Spain. Both were submerged by Embalse de Mediano.

See also 
 Catholic Church in Spain
 List of submerged places in Spain

References 

Mediano
Submerged buildings and structures